María Consuelo de las Heras Skoknić (born 22 September 1995) is a Chilean field hockey player.

Personal life
De las Heras was born and raised in Viña del Mar, and is the only member of the Chilean national team from the area.

She references Chilean teammate Carolina García, Rafael Nadal and Carli Lloyd as her sporting idols.

Career
Consuelo de las Heras has represented Chile at both senior and junior level, debuting in both divisions in 2016.

Junior National Team
In 2016, De las Heras represented the Chile Under 21 side at the Pan-Am Junior Championship, where she scored two goals in the teams bronze medal campaign.

She later represented the team at the Junior World Cup, where the team finished in 11th place.

Senior National Team
De las Heras first represented the senior national team at the 2016–17 FIH World League Round 1 in Chiclayo, Peru. 

Following her debut, De las Heras suffered an anterior cruciate ligament injury in 2017, ruling her out of competition for over a year. She returned to the national team in 2018, and has been a regular inclusion in the squad since her recovery.

International goals

References

1995 births
Living people
Chilean female field hockey players
Female field hockey forwards
Pan American Games competitors for Chile
Field hockey players at the 2019 Pan American Games
Sportspeople from Viña del Mar